"Blurred Lines" is a song by American singer Robin Thicke featuring fellow American musicians T.I. and Pharrell Williams from the former's sixth studio album of the same name (2013). Solely produced by the latter, it was released as the album's lead single on March 26, 2013, through Star Trak Recordings and Interscope Records. For the lyrics, Thicke said the song is about his former wife Paula Patton. Musically, "Blurred Lines" is an R&B and pop track with instrumentation consisting of bass guitar, drums, and percussion.

The song received generally negative reviews from music critics, with some saying it glorified rape culture. Commercially, the song topped the charts of 25 countries and reached the top five of six others. "Blurred Lines" spent 12 consecutive weeks atop the US Billboard Hot 100, making it the longest-running single of 2013 in the United States. In June 2018, the song was certified a diamond certification by the Recording Industry Association of America (RIAA). It became one of the best-selling singles of all time, with sales of 14.8 million, simultaneously breaking the record for the largest radio audience in history. The song was nominated for awards, including Record of the Year and Best Pop Duo/Group Performance at the 56th Annual Grammy Awards.

The music video for "Blurred Lines" was directed by Diane Martel. Two versions of the video exist: edited and unrated. In both of them, Thicke, T.I., and Williams are featured with models Emily Ratajkowski, Elle Evans, and Jessi M'Bengue performing several activities, including the models snuggling in bed with Thicke and sitting on a stuffed dog. After being on the site for just under one week, the unrated version, featuring topless models, was removed from YouTube for violating the site's terms of service. Many critics panned both videos, calling them misogynist and sexist.

To promote the song, Thicke performed on televised live events including the 2013 iHeartRadio Music Festival, The Ellen DeGeneres Show, and a highly controversial performance with American singer Miley Cyrus at the 2013 MTV Video Music Awards. The song became the subject of a legal dispute with the family of American singer Marvin Gaye and Bridgeport Music, who argued the song infringed on copyrights to Gaye's 1977 single "Got to Give It Up". Williams and Thicke were found liable for copyright infringement by a federal jury in March 2015, and Gaye was awarded posthumous songwriting credit based on the royalties pledged to his estate.

Background and production
American singers Robin Thicke and Pharrell Williams co-wrote "Blurred Lines" during a three-day writing session in July 2012. Williams first started to play a funk rhythm with syncopated cowbell accents on the drums, along with a simple two-chord progression. It became the spine of the track. Thicke improvised a melody and wrote lyrics about seducing another man's girlfriend. Within an hour and a half, both singers had the song recorded and completed. Thicke and Williams wanted to get a rapper from the Southern part of the United States to be part of the song. They ended up choosing American rapper T.I. T.I. would add a rap verse to the song several months later.

In an interview with GQ's Stelios Phili, Thicke explained that he and Williams were in the studio together when he told Williams that one of his favorite songs of all time was Marvin Gaye's 1977 single "Got to Give It Up". Thicke wanted to make a song similar to "Got to Give It Up". Thicke stated that he and Wiliams would go back and forth and sing lines like, "Hey, hey, hey!". Thicke told the Daily Star the song was "mostly throwaway fun", but said it was inspired by him and Williams being in love with their wives, having kids, and loving their mothers. He commented that both of them have a lot of respect for women. An ad was created for Radio Shack to market the Beats Pill, a small stereo, that showed Thicke, Pharrell, and the models repeating the look of the (clothed) music video, but with the models holding up the Beats Pill.

Music and lyrics

"Blurred Lines" has been described as a funk-inspired pop and R&B track. Its instrumentation consists of bass guitar, drums, and percussion. According to Emily Bootle of New Statesman, the song is light-hearted in nature and its musical humor is evident in the  "bouncing bassline, tongue-in cheek background yelps, the comically low pitch of the refrain 'I know you want it' and the laughter that follows the lyric 'What rhymes with 'hug me'?'."

Lyrically, "Blurred Lines" is about a woman Thicke is trying to pick up in a club. "The song is a come on", wrote Ken Tucker in a review of the song and its parent album for NPR. Tucker noted that what prevents the song from descending into creepiness is that Thicke remains "gentlemanly and debonair" when the object of his desire rejects him.

Other interpretations of the song's lyrical content were unfavorable. Elizabeth Plank of Mic considered the lyrics offensive, particularly Thicke repeatedly singing 'I know you want it' while T.I. raps: 'I'll give you something big enough to tear your ass in two." Sezin Koehler of Pacific Standard said the lyrics suggest that "women are supposed to enjoy pain during sex or that pain is part of sex" and went on to find in the lyrics other parallels to the act of rape."

Thicke told Howard Stern during an interview on The Howard Stern Show that "Blurred Lines" was inspired by his then-wife Paula Patton. He confessed to Stern: “My wife is Mrs. Good Girl, but gradually over our marriage, I’ve turned her into a bad girl.”

Critical reception 
"Blurred Lines" was panned by music critics, who stated that it glorifies rape culture. The Daily Beast Tricia Romano described the track as "kind of rapey." Callie Ahlgrim and Courteney Larocca of Insider commented in 2019 that "If you could cancel a song the way fans cancel artists, 'Blurred Lines' deserves to be that song." They continued, saying its "existence is a huge injustice to women everywhere." Spin magazine's Keith Harris remarked that the song is "a consensual two-way flirtation, a game both players get to win, with Thicke desperately launching goofball compliments at a woman who paws at him and prances away." Ann Powers for NPR declared that the verse: "I know you want it," objectifies women and condones rape. Writing for The Independent, Mollie Goodfellow described Thicke as the "weaselly face of the rape anthem 'Blurred Lines'."

Andy Hermann for The Village Voice stated that Thicke and Williams tried to ruin the summer of 2013 with their "smug turd of a pop tune" and deemed the song "terrible, tacky, [and] derivative." Writing for Rolling Stone, Rob Sheffield described "Blurred Lines" as "the worst song of this or any other year". He said he couldn't "remember the last time there was a hit song this ghastly – the sound of Adam Sandler taking a falsetto hate-whizz on Marvin Gaye's grave". Annie Zaleski of The A.V. Club said that the song's "old-man lecherousness and boys'-club friskiness . . . comes off as uncomfortable and demeaning."  Andy Kellman of AllMusic depicted "Blurred Lines" as a "marginalized genre of R&B". Greg Kot from the Chicago Tribune described the song's lyrics as "dunderheaded", while saying Thicke "scrapes bottom with his single-entendre come-on's." Trevor Anderson of Billboard opined it is "less a recall of a celebrated classic hit, but more a cautionary tale that still divides critics, creatives and consumers alike".

Jim Farber, writing for New York Daily News, called the song "irresistible" and mentioned it had an "utter lack of pretense". In her review for The Christian Science Monitor, Nekesa Mumbi Moody labeled the song as "undeniable", and wrote that it had become a "cultural flashpoint". The staff of The New Zealand Herald lauded the track as "cool" and "inventive". The Ledger James C. McKinley Jr praised "Blurred Lines" as a "catchy come-on". Brendon Veevers for Renowned for Sound remarked the track "really shows off Thicke's vocal dexterity as he bends and blends playfully within 4 minutes of seductive, sexually charged beats and hooks alongside fellow heavyweights T.I and hit-maker Pharrell". The staff of Rolling Stone place it at number 50 on their 100 Best Songs of 2013, saying "thanks to its lascivious, Pharrell-spun hook, it held the whole world in its slightly skeevy grasp all summer long".

Accolades
"Blurred Lines" has been nominated for multiple awards. "Blurred Lines" was nominated for Record of the Year and Best Pop Duo/Group Performance at the 56th Annual Grammy Awards. The song was nominated for Best Collaboration at the 2014 BET Awards. It was nominated for Hip-Hop/R&B Song of the Year at the 2014 iHeartRadio Music Awards and Single of the Year at the 2013 American Music Awards. It was nominated for was Best Collaboration and Best Song of the Summer at the 2013 MTV Video Music Awards while also nominated for Best Song at the 2013 MTV Europe Music Awards. "Blurred Lines" won Top Hot 100 Song, Top Digital Song, Top Radio Song, and Top R&B Song at the 2014 Billboard Music Awards. It also won an award for Song of the Year and Best Collaboration at the 2013 Soul Train Music Awards and Outstanding Duo or Group at the 45th NAACP Image Awards.

Release and commercial performance
"Blurred Lines" was released as the lead single on March 26, 2013, from Thicke's studio album of the same name (2013), through Star Trak Recordings and Interscope Records. It was released to Contemporary hit radio on May 21, 2013. It was released as a single with a remix by Filipino music prouder Laidback Luke in the United Kingdom on May 24, 2013. A remix featuring Colombian singer J Balvin was released on July 23, 2013, in Colombia. A no rap version of the track was released alongside Laidback Luke's remix and both music videos. An EP featuring remixes by Laidback Luke, Australian producer Will Sparks, and American producer DallasK was made for the single. Another EP for was released for "Blurred Lines". The EP also features the Laidback Luke remix, "When I Get You Alone", "Lost Without U", "Magic", and "Sex Therapy".

"Blurred Lines" debuted at number 94 on the US Billboard Hot 100. After the song's unrated version of the video was released, the song rose from number 54 to number 11. The track rose from number 11 to number 6, giving Thicke his first top 10 hit in the US. The song would later rise from number six to number one in June 2013, giving T.I. his fourth, Pharrell his third, and Thicke's first number one hit in the US. "Blurred Lines" topped the Hot 100 for 12 consecutive weeks, making it the longest running single of 2013. Billboard named "Blurred Lines" the song of the summer in September 2013. On the Billboard Hot R&B/Hip-Hop Songs chart, the song reigned at number one for 16 weeks, making it one longest tracks to stay at number one on the chart. In June 2018, The single was certified a diamond certification by the Recording Industry Association of America (RIAA), denoting track-equivalent sales of 10,000,000 units in the US based on sales and streams.

The song also peaked at number one on the Billboard Adult Top 40,  Mainstream Top 40, and Rhythmic charts. In the United Kingdom, the song debuted at number one on the UK Singles Chart, selling 190,000 copies in its first week. The remained at number one the following week, selling even more than it did in its first with 200,000 copies sold. It spent five non-consecutive weeks at number one. "Blurred Lines" was confirmed to have sold 1 million copies on its 50th day of release, becoming William's second song in only a month to achieve that feat in Britain after being featured on Daft Punk single "Get Lucky". According to the Official Charts Company, the single became Britain's best-selling single of 2013 with sales of 1,472,681 copies. It became one of the best-selling singles of all time, with sales of 14.8 million, simultaneously breaking the record for the largest radio audience in history.

Music video

Background and synopsis
A music video for "Blurred Lines" was directed by Diane Martel and was released on March 20, 2013, while an unrated version was released on March 28, 2013. After being on the site for just under one week, the unrated version of the video was removed from YouTube on March 30, 2013, citing violations of the site's terms of service that restricts the uploading of videos containing nudity, particularly if used in a sexual context.  However, it was later restored on July 12, 2013. The unrated video remains available on Vevo, while the edited version is available on both Vevo and YouTube. The unrated version of "Blurred Lines" generated more than one million views in the days following its release on Vevo. Thicke told GQ they wanted to do "old men dances" and imitate how they were in the studio. They tried to do everything that was prohibited by social custom. He stated they did bestiality, drug injections, and things that are derogatory towards women. When it came to the balloon arrangement, Thicke said it was Martel's idea. They wanted to "go over the top" and be as witless as possible.

In an interview with Grantland, Martel stated that Thicke wanted her to make a white cyc video for "Blurred Lines". She heard the song and instantly fell in love with it. She sat and thought about the ideas for what the models could wear in the video. She realized they could wear shoes, and that it would get attention for the song and the artist. Martel said the hashtags were pretty obvious idea because she thought Robin's last name is strong and supposed it had subconscious connotations. Martel asked an art director named Georgia Walker to find "gross" and "oversized" props like a hose and stuffed dog. Martel said she wanted to deal with the "misogynist, funny lyrics in a way where the girls were going to overpower the men". She came up with the idea to come up with a nude video but turned down the job after Thicke and his team refused. They came back later agreeing to do the nude video if Martel would do a clothed version. The video features Thicke, T.I., and Williams.  It also includes three models: Emily Ratajkowski, Elle Evans, and Jessi M'Bengue. The video features a "Robin Thicke Has a Big Dick" sign spelled out in silver Mylar balloons. The visual sees the topless models snuggling in bed with Thicke, meowing seductively at the camera, with one the models riding the stuffed dog while sticking her tongue out.

Reception
Kat Bein of Miami New Times described the visual as "misogynist", and said that it "objectifi[ed] naked women". Bertie Brandes of Vice said the video is "a masterpiece of idiocy and the level of stupidity and arrogance required in order for a video this banal, offensive and unimaginative is almost impressive". She continues, saying "except, it's not impressive at all, is it? It's ugly sexist uninspired bullshit dressed up as naughtiness, and it's creepy". Writing for Slate, Geeta Dayal called the video "loathsome". Aidan Moffa for The Quietus labeled it is as "awful, sexist and asinine". The Cut Ann Friedman mentions that her issue was not the naked women and it being inappropriate. She opined it "featuring naked models and clothed men in party mode is boring, uninventive, and slightly alienating".

Thicke responded to the negative criticism of the video. He said that the video of him dancing around with the naked models should only be controversial to "extra-religious people", and stated it was Martel's idea and actually preferred the clothed version and didn't even want to use the naked version until his wife and her friends said he should put out that video. Thicke told Digital Spy the critics needed "to come up with something more original" when calling it sexist. In February 2021, Thicke said to the New York Post that he was never going to make a video like "Blurred Lines" ever again.

Ratajkowski at first defended the video, saying she didn't think it was sexist and was made with a "sarcastic attitude". She said that they were "being playful" and having a good time with their body. The model thought it was important for young women to have that confidence, and that it is actually celebrating women and their bodies. In an interview with InStyle in September 2015, Ratajkowski stated the video is "the bane of my existence". The visual was nominated for Video of the Year and Best Male Video at the 2013 MTV Video Music Awards. It was also nominated for Best Video at the 2013 MTV Europe Music Awards.

Controversy and criticism
One of the most controversial pop songs in history, "Blurred Lines" was criticized upon release for trivializing sexual violence, objectifying women, and "reinforcing rape myths". Katie Russell, a spokeswoman for Rape Crisis, a charity that raises awareness and understanding of sexual violence, said the lyrics glamorized violence against women and reinforced rape myths. They thought the lyrics and the video seemed to objectify and degrade women, using "misogynistic language and imagery that many people would find not only distasteful or offensive but also really quite old fashioned". They concluded, saying certain lyrics are "explicitly sexually violent and appear to reinforce victim-blaming rape myths".

In the United Kingdom, more than 20 universities banned the song from use at student events. At the University of Edinburgh, students' association officials stated that the song violates its policy against "rape culture and lad banter" and promotes an unhealthy attitude towards sex and consent. It was also banned at other British institutions, including Plymouth University, Leeds University, University of Derby, Queen Mary University of London, Kingston University, University of Bolton, Queen's University Belfast, University of Birmingham, University of East Anglia, University of the West of Scotland, and a number of Oxford and Durham colleges. Students at the University of Exeter voted for a condemnation of the lyrics to be issued by the Students' Guild. In Marshfield, Wisconsin, Lisa Joling, head coach of the Marshfield High School dance team, was fired in August 2013, three days after a halftime performance by her dance class to the song.

Williams initially defended "Blurred Lines". The singer told NPR there was nothing misogynistic about it, and that he was grateful to everybody that supported the song. Further defending the song, Williams mentioned to Pitchfork that there was nothing controversial about the song and appreciated how "Blurred Lines" helped Thicke "to a place where he deserves to be vocally". In October 2019, Williams told GQ he "didn't get it" because he thought women enjoyed the song and connected to its "energetic spirit". The singer then said he realized that there are men who use "that same language" when taking advantage of a woman. The singer said he did not act or think like that. He only cared about how it affected women. It opened his mind to what was actually being sung in the song and how it could make a person feel. He concluded by mentioning he realized that "we live in a chauvinist culture in our country. Hadn't realized that. Didn't realize that some of my songs catered to that."

Accusations of sexual harassment 
On October 3, 2021, model and actress Emily Ratajkowski published an excerpt from her memoir My Body in the British magazine The Sunday Times, in which she recounts that she was sexually harassed by Thicke during filming of the music video for "Blurred Lines":"Suddenly, out of nowhere, I felt the coolness and foreignness of a stranger's hands cupping my bare breasts from behind, [...] I instinctively moved away, looking back at Robin Thicke. He smiled a goofy grin and stumbled backward, his eyes concealed behind his sunglasses. My head turned to the darkness beyond the set. [The director, Diane Martel's] voice cracked as she yelled out to me, 'Are you okay?' " The video director Diane Martel supported Ratajkowski by stating that she yelled at the singer asking for an explanation and immediately shutting down the shoot, getting a sheepish apology from Thicke, as if he knew it was wrong without understanding how it might have felt for Emily.

Lawsuit

In August 2013, Thicke, Williams, and T.I. sued Gaye's family and Bridgeport Music for a declaratory judgment that "Blurred Lines" did not infringe copyrights of the defendants. Gaye's family accused the song's authors of copying the "feel" and "sound" of "Got to Give It Up". In the lawsuit, Gaye's family was accused of making an invalid copyright claim since only expressions, not individual ideas can be protected. In September 2014, The Hollywood Reporter released files relating to a deposition from the case. Within the deposition Thicke stated that he was inebriated on Vicodin and alcohol when he showed up to record the song in the studio, and that Williams had the beat and wrote the vast majority of the song. Within Williams' respective deposition file, the producer noted that he was "in the driver's seat" during the song's creation and agreed that Thicke, in past interviews, "embellished" his contributions to the songwriting process.

On October 30, 2014, United States District Court for the Central District of California Judge John A. Kronstadt ruled the Gaye family's lawsuit against Thicke and Williams could proceed, stating the plaintiffs "have made a sufficient showing that elements of 'Blurred Lines' may be substantially similar to protected, original elements of 'Got to Give It Up'." The trial was set to begin on February 10, 2015. Williams and Thicke filed a successful motion in limine to prevent a recording of "Got to Give it Up" from being played during the trial. The motion was granted because the family's copyright covered the sheet music and not necessarily other musical elements from Gaye's recording of the song. On March 10, 2015, a jury found Thicke and Williams, but not T.I., liable for copyright infringement. The unanimous jury awarded Gaye's family 7.4 million in damages for copyright infringement and credited Marvin Gaye as a songwriter for "Blurred Lines". In July 2015, the judge rejected a new trial and the verdict was lowered from 7.4 million to 5.3 million.

In August 2016, Thicke, Williams, and T.I. appealed the judgment to the 9th Circuit Court of Appeals. A few days later, more than 200 musicians – including among others Rivers Cuomo of Weezer, John Oates of Hall & Oates, R. Kelly, Hans Zimmer, Jennifer Hudson as well as members of Train, Earth, Wind & Fire, the Black Crowes, Fall Out Boy, the Go-Go's and Tears for Fears – filed an amicus curiae brief, authored by attorney Ed McPherson, in support of the appeal, stating that "the verdict in this case threatens to punish songwriters for creating new music that is inspired by prior works." In December 2018, the Ninth Circuit affirmed the district court's finding of infringement against Williams and Thicke. Both singers still had to pay Gaye's family 5.3 million. Thicke was also ordered to pay more than 1.7 million and Williams and his publishing company had to pay 357,631 in separate awards to Gaye's estate. In December 2019, Gaye's family opened the lawsuit back up again, accusing Williams of lying under oath during the trial. The plaintiffs cited a GQ interview from November of that same year in which Williams said he "reverse engineered" "Got to Give It Up", saying that it countered his statement during a deposition that he "did not go in the studio with the intention of making anything feel like, or to sound like, Marvin Gaye." In February 2021, Kronstadt ruled that Williams did not commit perjury, saying: "The statements by Williams during the November 2019 Interview were cryptic and amenable to multiple interpretations."

Live performances
On May 14, 2013, Thicke performed the song for the first time live on NBC's The Voice alongside Williams and T.I. Thicke also performed the song on The Ellen DeGeneres Show on May 16 with Pharrell and three models doing backup. In June 2013, Thicke performed the song alongside Williams with American actress Hayden Panettiere dancing to the song on the British television chat show The Graham Norton Show. Thicke, Williams, and T.I. performed the song on the 2013 BET Awards on June 30, 2013. They performed against a backdrop of Thicke's name in giant red block letters.  Thicke also performed the track solo on BBC Radio 1 Live Lounge on July 8, 2013, as well as This Morning on July 10, 2013.

Thicke also performed the song complete with dancers in studio on The Howard Stern Show on Sirius XM Radio on July 29, 2013. He also performed the song on The Colbert Report on August 6, 2013, after French duo Daft Punk canceled. On September 20, he performed "Blurred Lines" at the 2013 iHeartRadio Music Festival. On November 10, Thicke performed the song with Iggy Azalea at the 2013 MTV Europe Music Awards. In December, he performed the song at Jingle Ball 2013 concerts. In May 2014, Williams performed the song as part of a medley at the iHeartRadio Awards where he received the iHeartRadio Innovator Award. In May 2017, Thicke performed the song at the 4th Indonesian Choice Awards.

MTV Video Music Awards 
Thicke performed "Blurred Lines" as a duet with American singer Miley Cyrus at the 2013 MTV Video Music Awards, medleyed with Cyrus' "We Can't Stop" and "Give It 2 U", featuring 2 Chainz. The performance began with Cyrus performing "We Can't Stop" in bear-themed attire. Following this, Thicke entered the stage and Cyrus stripped down to a small skin-colored two-piece outfit. Cyrus subsequently touched Thicke's crotch area with a giant foam finger and twerked against his crotch. The performance drew extensive reactions and became the most tweeted about event in history, with Twitter users generating 360,000 tweets about the event per minute; breaking the previous record held by Beyoncé's Super Bowl XLVII halftime show performance six months earlier.

Critics universally panned the performance. Shirley Halperin for The Hollywood Reporter described the performance as "crass" and "reminiscent of a bad acid trip". Writing for the American news program Today, Anna Chan called the performance "embarrassingly raunchy", while Katy Kroll of Rolling Stone labeled it a "hot mess". The performance was described by XXL critic B. J. Steiner as a "trainwreck in the classic sense of the word as the audience reaction seemed to be a mix of confusion, dismay and horror in a cocktail of embarrassment". Louisa Peacock and Isabelle Kerr of Telegraph described Cyrus' actions as her going into "overdrive [...] trying to kill off her Disney millstone, Hannah Montana. In July 2017, Cyrus said she felt sexualized while twerking during the performance.

Parodies 
On the June 12, 2013, episode of Jimmy Kimmel Live!, in which Thicke and Pharrell were both guests, they aired a parody version of the "Blurred Lines" video in which host Jimmy Kimmel and his sidekick Guillermo attempt to join Thicke, Pharrell, and the dancers but keep getting rebuffed. On August 2, 2013, Bart Baker released a parody of "Blurred Lines" on his YouTube channel. On September 11, 2013, the drag queen group DWV (Detox, Willam Belli, and Vicky Vox), released a parody called "Blurred Bynes". The song is about Amanda Bynes and her behavior in the previous months. On November 5, 2013, Dave Callan, as part of his review of Just Dance 2014 on the ABC show Good Game performed a parody of the music video in response to the incorrect choreography of the song in the game. On December 19, 2013, the Canadian sketch comedy group Royal Canadian Air Farce released a parody of the music video called "Rob Ford's Blurred Lines" highlighting the recent admissions by Toronto mayor Rob Ford of public drunkenness and using crack cocaine. On July 15, 2014, "Weird Al" Yankovic released a parody of the song entitled "Word Crimes" from his album Mandatory Fun. A music video for the song was released the same day.

Track listing 
Digital download and streaming
"Blurred Lines" (featuring Pharrell Williams and T.I.) – 4:22

Colombia single
"Blurred Lines" (featuring Pharrell Williams and J Balvin) – 4:22

UK single
"Blurred Lines" (featuring Pharrell Williams and T.I.) [Clean] – 4:22
"Blurred Lines" (featuring Pharrell & T.I.) [Laidback Luke Remix] – 4:39

No Rap single
"Blurred Lines" (featuring Pharrell Williams) [No Rap Version] – 3:50
"Blurred Lines" (featuring Pharrell and T.I.) [Laidback Luke Remix] – 4:40
"Blurred Lines" (featuring Pharrell Williams and T.I.) [Music Video] – 4:33
"Blurred Lines" (featuring Pharrell Williams and T.I.) [Music Video – Clean] – 4:33

The Remixes
"Blurred Lines" (featuring Pharrell and T.I.) (Laidback Luke Remix) – 4:40
"Blurred Lines" (featuring Pharrell and T.I.) (Will Sparks Remix) – 5:08
"Blurred Lines" (featuring Pharrell and T.I.) (DallasK Remix) – 5:00

EP
"Blurred Lines" (featuring Pharrell Williams and T.I.) – 4:23
"Blurred Lines" (featuring Pharrell & T.I.) [Laidback Luke Remix] – 4:40
"When I Get You Alone" – 3:36
"Lost Without U" – 4:14
"Magic" – 3:53
"Sex Therapy" – 4:35

Credits and personnel
Credits and personnel adapted from Blurred Lines album liner notes.

 Robin Thicke – writer, vocals
 Pharrell Williams – writer, vocals, producer, instruments
 T.I. – writer, vocals
 Marvin Gaye – writer
 Andrew Coleman – recording, digital editing, arrangement
 Todd Hurt – recording assistant
 Tony Maserati – mixing at Mirrorball Studios (North Hollywood)
 Justin Hergett – mixing assistant
 James Krausse – mixing assistant
 Chris Gehringer – mastering

Charts

Weekly charts

Year-end charts

Decade-end charts

All-time charts

Certifications and sales

See also 
 2013 in American music
 List of best-selling singles
 List of best-selling singles in the United States
 List of best-selling singles in Australia
 List of million-selling singles in the United Kingdom
 List of Billboard Hot 100 number-one singles of 2013
 List of Billboard Hot 100 top 10 singles in 2013
 List of number-one R&B/hip-hop songs of 2013 (U.S.)
 List of Hot 100 number-one singles of 2013 (Canada)
 List of number-one singles of 2013 (Australia)
List of number-one singles of 2013 (South Africa)

Notes

References

External links 
 
 side-by-side views of the official and unrated versions of the controversial "Blurred Lines" videos

2012 songs
2013 singles
APRA Award winners
Robin Thicke songs
T.I. songs
Pharrell Williams songs
Songs written by Robin Thicke
Songs written by T.I.
Songs written by Pharrell Williams
Songs written by Marvin Gaye
Song recordings produced by Pharrell Williams
Music video controversies
Number-one singles in Australia
Number-one singles in Austria
Number-one singles in Germany
Number-one singles in Israel
Number-one singles in New Zealand
Number-one singles in Poland
Number-one singles in Scotland
South African Airplay Chart number-one singles
Number-one singles in Switzerland
Irish Singles Chart number-one singles
UK Singles Chart number-one singles
Billboard Hot 100 number-one singles
Canadian Hot 100 number-one singles
Record Report Pop Rock General number-one singles
Music videos directed by Diane Martel
Interscope Records singles
Star Trak Entertainment singles
2013 controversies
Obscenity controversies in music
Songs involved in plagiarism controversies
Songs involved in royalties controversies